is a Prefectural Natural Park in Wakayama Prefecture, Japan. Established in 1958, the park is wholly located within the town of Yura. The park's central feature is the eponymous .

See also
 National Parks of Japan
 List of Places of Scenic Beauty of Japan (Wakayama)

References

External links
  Map of Shirasaki Kaigan Prefectural Natural Park

Parks and gardens in Wakayama Prefecture
Yura, Wakayama
Protected areas established in 1958
1958 establishments in Japan